Ankang class ambulance craft is a class of little known naval auxiliary ship currently in service with the People's Liberation Army Navy (PLAN). The exact type still remains unknown, because the only official Chinese governmental information released on these crafts is that they are classified as fast ambulance craft, and has received NATO reporting name Ankang class, or 安康 in Chinese, meaning Well-Being. By Chinese classification, any naval vessel with displacement above a thousand ton is classified as ship / warship, and any naval vessel with displacement less than a thousand ton is classified as a boat / craft. Ankang class is the only boat / craft in the Chinese navy that is capable of hosting a helicopter, though it only has a landing pad, but not any hangar. A total of five units of this class have been confirmed in active service as of mid-2010s.

Ankang class series boats in PLAN service are designated by a combination of two Chinese characters followed by three-digit number. The second Chinese character is Yi (医), short for Yi-Liao (医疗), meaning medical care in Chinese, because these ships are classified as crew boats. The first Chinese character denotes which fleet the boat is service with, with East (Dong, 东) for East Sea Fleet, North (Bei, 北) for North Sea Fleet, and South (Nan, 南) for South Sea Fleet. However, the pennant numbers are subject to change due to changes of Chinese naval ships naming convention, or when units are transferred between different fleets. Specification:
Length (m): 61

References

Auxiliary ships of the People's Liberation Army Navy